The Massachusetts House of Representatives 3rd Hampshire District or "3rd Hampshire" is an electoral district for the Massachusetts House of Representatives. It consists of the towns of Amherst, Pelham and precinct 1 of Granby. Democrat Mindy Domb of Amherst has represented the district since 2019.

The current district geographic boundary overlaps with those of the Massachusetts Senate's 1st Hampden and Hampshire district and  Hampshire, Franklin and Worcester district.

District History
The district has existed in its current form since 2011, but has existed in name since at least 1974.

Former locales
The district previously covered:
 Hadley, circa 1872, 1927 
 Hatfield, circa 1872, 1927 
 South Hadley, circa 1927 
 Williamsburg, circa 1872

Representatives
 Spencer Shaw, circa 1859 
 Henry F. Paige, circa 1920

Elections
Election data comes from Massachusetts Election Statistics.

2010

2012

2014

2016

2018

See also
 Other Hampshire County districts of the Massachusetts House of Representatives: 1st, 2nd
 Hampshire County districts of the Massachusett Senate: Berkshire, Hampshire, Franklin, and Hampden; 1st Hampden and Hampshire; 2nd Hampden and Hampshire; Hampshire, Franklin and Worcester
 List of former districts of the Massachusetts House of Representatives

Images
Portraits of legislators

References

External links
 Amherst League of Women Voters

House Hampshire 03